Route 347 is a collector road in the Canadian province of Nova Scotia. It is located in the northeastern part of the province and connects New Glasgow at Trunk 4 with Aspen at Trunk 7.

Communities 
New Glasgow
Priestville
Coalburn
Greenwood
MacPhersons Mills
Blue Mountain
Moose River
Garden of Eden
Eden Lake
Rocky Mountain
Willowdale
East River St. Marys
Newtown
Denver
Aspen

See also
List of Nova Scotia provincial highways

References

347
347
347
Transport in New Glasgow, Nova Scotia